Cyanotis beddomei, the teddy bear vine, is a species of flowering plant in the family Commelinaceae, native to Kerala and  Tamil Nadu states in southern India. It has gained the Royal Horticultural Society's Award of Garden Merit. It may be synonymous with Belosynapsis kewensis.

References

beddomei
Endemic flora of India (region)
Plants described in 2008
Taxa named by Joseph Dalton Hooker